L-765,314 is a drug which acts as a potent and selective antagonist of the α1-adrenergic receptor subtype α1B. It has mainly been used to investigate the role of α1B-adrenergic receptors in the regulation of blood pressure. The α1B receptor is also thought to have an important role in the brain; however, L-765,314 does not cross the blood–brain barrier.

References

Alpha-1 blockers
Carbamates
Carboxamides
Peripherally selective drugs
Phenol ethers
Piperazines
Quinazolines
Tert-butyl compounds